The Matagorda County Monument,  in Bay City, Texas, was listed on the National Register of Historic Places in 2018.

It was designed by architects Page & Southerland and sculptor Raoul Josset.

References

External links

National Register of Historic Places in Matagorda County, Texas
Monuments and memorials in Texas
Buildings and structures completed in 1936
Texas Revolution monuments and memorials
History of Texas